Li Yat Chun (born 8 December 1995 in Hong Kong) is a former Hong Kong professional football player who played as a goalkeeper.

Club career
In 2015, Li joined Dreams Metro Gallery.

On 22 October 2020, Rangers announced the signing of Li. He was not retained after the season.

Honours

Club
 Hong Kong Senior Shield: 2014–15

References

External links
 Li Yat Chun at HKFA
 

1995 births
Living people
Hong Kong footballers
Eastern Sports Club footballers
Metro Gallery FC players
Southern District FC players
Hong Kong Rangers FC players
Association football goalkeepers
Hong Kong Premier League players